Numerous massacres are recorded against the minority Nizari Ismaili Shia Muslims, particularly during the Alamut Period.

In many cases, the victims include non-Nizaris; such as supporters of the Nizaris, and people who are falsely accused and killed due to personal enmity.

The Nizari response was often the assassination of the leader behind the massacre.

List

See also
Nizari–Seljuk wars
List of assassinations by the Assassins

References

12th-century conflicts
Massacres
Massacres in Iran
Massacres in Syria
Syria history-related lists
11th century-related lists
12th century-related lists
13th century-related lists
11th-century deaths
12th-century deaths
13th-century deaths
Isma'ilism-related lists
Nizaris
Massacres committed by former countries
Religious massacres